Last Year at Marienbad (released in the United Kingdom as Last Year in Marienbad) is a 1961 Left Bank film directed by Alain Resnais from a screenplay by Alain Robbe-Grillet. Set in a palace in a park that has been converted into a luxury hotel, it stars Delphine Seyrig and Giorgio Albertazzi as a woman and a man who may have met the year before and may have contemplated or started an affair, with Sacha Pitoëff as a second man who may be the woman's husband. The characters are unnamed.

Plot
In an ornate baroque hotel populated by wealthy individuals and couples who socialize with each other, a man approaches a woman and claims they met the year before at a similar resort (perhaps at Frederiksbad, Karlstadt, Marienbad, or Baden-Salsa) and had a romantic relationship, but she responded to his request to run away together by asking him to wait a year, which time has now elapsed. The woman insists she has never met the man, so he proceeds to attempt to remind her of their shared past, while she rebuffs him and contradicts his account. Between interactions with the woman, a second man, who may be the woman's husband, asserts his dominance over the first man by repeatedly beating him at a mathematical game (a version of Nim).

Through ambiguous flashbacks and disorienting shifts of time and location, the film explores the relationships between the three characters. Conversations and events are repeated in different places in the building and grounds, and there are numerous tracking shots of the hotel's corridors with ambiguous and repetitive voice-overs. No certain conclusion is offered regarding what is real and what is imagined, but at the end of the film the woman submits and leaves the hotel with the first man.

Cast

 Giorgio Albertazzi as the man
 Delphine Seyrig as the woman
 Sacha Pitoëff as the second man, who may be the woman's husband

While the characters are unnamed in the film, in Robbe-Grillet's published "ciné-novel" of the screenplay the first man is referred to with the letter "X", the woman with the letter "A", and the second man with the letter "M".

Production
Last Year at Marienbad was created out of an unusual collaboration between its writer, Alain Robbe-Grillet, and its director, Alain Resnais. Robbe-Grillet described its basis:

The screenplay Robbe-Grillet wrote was very detailed, specifying not only the dialogue and gestures and décor, but also the placement and movement of the camera and the sequencing of shots in the editing. Resnais filmed the script with great fidelity, and when Robbe-Grillet, who was not present during the filming, saw the rough-cut, he said he found the film just as he had intended it, while recognizing how much Resnais had added to make it work on the screen and fill out what was absent from the script. Robbe-Grillet published his screenplay, illustrated by shots from the film, calling it a "ciné-roman" (ciné-novel).

Despite the close correspondence between the written and filmed works, numerous differences between them have been identified. Two notable examples are the choice of music in the film (Francis Seyrig's score introduces extensive use of a solo organ), and a scene near the end of the film in which the screenplay explicitly describes a rape, whereas the film substitutes a series of repeated overexposed tracking shots moving towards the smiling woman. In statements by the two authors of the film in the decades after its release, it was partly acknowledged that they did not entirely share the same vision of it. According to Resnais, Robbe-Grillet used to insist that it was he who wrote Marienbad, without question, and that Resnais's filming of it was a betrayal—but that since he found it very beautiful he did not blame Resnais for it.

Filming took place, using black-and-white film and the Dyaliscope widescreen process, over a period of ten weeks between September and November 1960. Most of Delphine Seyrig's dresses in the film were designed by Chanel. The locations used for most of the interiors and the gardens were the palaces of Schleissheim and Nymphenburg, including the Amalienburg hunting lodge, and the Antiquarium of the Residenz, all of which are in and around Munich. Additional interior scenes were filmed in the Photosonore-Marignan-Simo studios in Paris. No filming was done in the Czech spa town of Marienbad, nor does the film allow the viewer to know with certainty which, if any, scenes are supposed to be located there.

Style

In determining the visual appearance of the film, Resnais said he wanted to recreate "a certain style of silent cinema", which he sought to produce through his direction, as well as the actors' make-up; he even asked Eastman Kodak if they could supply an old-fashioned filmstock that would "bloom" or "halo" to create the look of a silent film, but they could not.  Resnais showed his costume designer photographs from Marcel L'Herbier's L'Inhumaine (1924) and L'Argent (1928), for which great fashion designers of the 1920s had created the costumes, and asked members of his team to look at other silent films, particularly G. W. Pabst's Pandora's Box (1929), as he wanted Seyrig's appearance and manner to resemble that of Louise Brooks in that film (a plan that was undermined somewhat when Seyrig cut her hair, necessitating the development of her own iconic hairstyle). The style of certain silent films is also suggested by the manner in which the characters who populate the hotel are mostly seen in artificial poses, as if frozen in time, rather than behaving naturalistically.

The film continually creates an ambiguity in the spatial and temporal aspects of what it shows and creates uncertainty in the mind of the spectator about the causal relationships between events. This is achieved through editing by giving apparently incompatible information in consecutive shots, or within a single shot that seems to show impossible juxtapositions, or by means of repetitions of events in different settings. These ambiguities are matched by contradictions in the narrator's voice-over commentary. Among the notable images in the film is a scene in which two characters (and the camera) rush out of the château and are faced with a tableau of figures arranged in a geometric garden; although the people cast long dramatic shadows (which were painted on the ground), the trees in the garden do not (and are, in fact, not real trees, but constructions).

The manner in which the film is edited challenged the established classical style of narrative construction. It allowed the themes of time and the mind and the interaction of past and present to be explored in an original way. As spatial and temporal continuity is destroyed by the methods of filming and editing that are used, the film offers instead a "mental continuity", a continuity of thought.

While films that immediately preceded and followed Marienbad in Resnais's career showed a political engagement with contemporary issues (the atomic bomb, the aftermath of the occupation of France, the then-taboo subject of the war in Algeria), Marienbad was seen as going in a completely different direction and focusing principally on style. Commenting on this departure, Resnais said: "I was making this film at a time when I think, rightly, that one could not make a film, in France, without speaking about the Algerian War. Indeed I wonder whether the closed and stifling atmosphere of L'Année does not result from those contradictions."

Reception
Contemporary critical response to the film was polarized. The controversy was fueled when Robbe-Grillet and Resnais appeared to give contradictory answers when asked whether the man and woman had actually met at Marienbad last year or not, as this was used as a means of attacking the film by those who disliked it.

In 1963, the writer and filmmaker Ado Kyrou declared the film a total triumph in his influential Le Surréalisme au cinéma, recognizing the ambiguous environment and obscure motives within the film as representing many of the concerns of surrealism in narrative cinema. Another early supporter, the actor and surrealist Jacques Brunius, declared that "Marienbad is the greatest film ever made".

Less reverently, film critic Pauline Kael called Marienbad "the high-fashion experimental film, the snow job at the ice palace ... back at the no-fun party for non-people". The film received an entry in The Fifty Worst Films of All Time, in which authors Harry Medved, Randy Dreyfuss, and Michael Medved lampooned its surrealistic style and quoted numerous critics who found it to be pretentious or incomprehensible.

The movie inspired a brief craze for the variation of Nim played by the characters.

Although it remains disparaged by some critics, Last Year at Marienbad has come to be regarded by many as one of Resnais' greatest works. Review aggregation website They Shoot Pictures, Don't They has determined it to be the 83rd most acclaimed movie in history, and it received 23 votes in the British Film Institute's decennial Sight & Sound polls. The Japanese filmmaker Akira Kurosawa cited it as one of his favorite films.

In July 2018, Marienbad was selected to be screened at the 75th Venice International Film Festival in the "Venice Classics" section.

Awards
The film was refused entry to the Cannes Film Festival, reportedly because Resnais had signed Jean-Paul Sartre's Manifesto of the 121 against the Algerian War, but it won the Golden Lion at the 22nd Venice International Film Festival in 1961.  In 1962, it was chosen as the best French film of the previous year by the French Syndicate of Cinema Critics. It was selected as the French entry for Best Foreign Language Film at the 34th Academy Awards in 1962 and, though it was not chosen as one of the five nominees for that award, Robbe-Grillet was nominated for the Academy Award for Best Original Screenplay the following year for his work on the film. The film was also nominated for a Hugo Award in the Best Dramatic Presentation category.

Interpretations
Numerous explanations of the film's events have been put forward, among them: that it is a version of the Orpheus and Eurydice myth, that it represents the relationship between patient and psychoanalyst, that it all takes place in the woman's mind, that it all takes place in the man's mind and depicts his refusal to acknowledge he has killed the woman he loved, and that the characters are ghosts or dead souls in limbo. Some have noted the film has the atmosphere and the form of a dream, and claim the structure of the film may be understood by the analogy of a recurring dream, or even that the man's meeting with the woman is the memory (or dream) of a dream.

Others have heeded, at least as a starting point, the indications given by Robbe-Grillet in the introduction to his "ciné-novel" of the screenplay: "Two attitudes are then possible: either the spectator will try to reconstitute some 'Cartesian' scheme – the most linear, the most rational he can devise – and this spectator will certainly find the film difficult if not incomprehensible; or else the spectator will let himself be carried along by the extraordinary images in front of him ... and to this spectator, the film will seem the easiest he has ever seen: a film addressed exclusively to his sensibility, to his faculties of sight, hearing, feeling." As a suggestion of how one might view the work, he offered that "The whole film, as a matter of fact, is the story of a persuading ["une persuasion"]: it deals with a reality which the hero creates out of his own vision, out of his own words."

Resnais, for his part, gave a more abstract explanation of the film's purpose: "For me this film is an attempt, still very crude and very primitive, to approach the complexity of thought, of its processes."

Influence
The impact of Last Year at Marienbad upon other filmmakers has been widely recognized and variously illustrated, extending from French directors (like Agnès Varda, Marguerite Duras, and Jacques Rivette) to international figures (like Ingmar Bergman and Federico Fellini). Stanley Kubrick's The Shining (1980) and David Lynch's Inland Empire (2006) are two films that are cited with particular frequency as showing the influence of Marienbad. Terence Young stated that he styled the pre-credits sequence of the James Bond film From Russia with Love (1963) on Marienbad, and Peter Greenaway said the film had been the most important influence upon his own filmmaking (and he himself would go on to establish a close working relationship with its cinematographer, Sacha Vierny).

The film's visual style has been imitated in many TV commercials and fashion photography, and the music video for "To the End", a 1994 single by British rock group Blur, is based on it.

Marienbad was the main inspiration for Karl Lagerfeld's Chanel Spring–Summer 2011 collection, as Coco Chanel designed the costumes for the film.  Lagerfeld's show was complete with a fountain and a modern replica of the film's famous garden, which he combined with the gardens at Versailles.

Chanel designer Virginie Viard reused Lagerfeld's idea of basing a collection around the film for 2022's fall Paris Fashion Week.

Home video releases
On 23 June 2009, the Criterion Collection released Last Year at Marienbad in the United States, on both Region 1 DVD and Blu-ray Disc. Alain Resnais participated in this release, and he insisted it include an unrestored soundtrack in addition to the restored one, saying:

The Criterion packaging of the film went out of print in March 2013.

StudioCanal released the film in Europe on Blu-ray and DVD in September 2018, and Kino Lorber released it in the United States in August 2019.

Notes

References

Sources

Further reading
 Grunenberg, Christoph, and Eva Fischer-Hausdorf [eds.]. Last Year in Marienbad: a Film as Art. Cologne: Wienand Verlag, 2015. (Reviewed by Duncan Fallowell, "Homage to Alain Resnais's mesmerising masterpiece, Last Year in Marienbad", in The Spectator, 3 September 2016.)
Hays, David L. "Knowing and Not Knowing, Moving and Not Moving, in Alain Resnais's L'Année dernière à Marienbad." Polysèmes 19 (2018); https://journals.openedition.org/polysemes/3438.
 Leutrat, Jean-Louis. L'Année dernière à Marienbad. (London: British Film Institute, 2000).
 Powell, Dilys. The Dilys Powell Film Reader. (Manchester: Carcanet, 1991) pp. 372–373. (Review published in The Sunday Times, 1962, preceded by notes made during Sep. 1961 - Feb. 1962. Review also printed in The Golden Screen. (London: Pavilion Books, 1989) pp. 183–184.)
 Robbe-Grillet, Alain. L'Année dernière à Marienbad: ciné-roman. (Paris: Les Éditions de Minuit, 1961).  English translation: Last Year at Marienbad:  a Ciné-Novel; translated from the French by Richard Howard. (London: John Calder, 1962).

External links
 
 
 
 Last Year at Marienbad – comprehensive collection of articles, production information, bibliography, gallery and script details, at Neugraphic
 Last Year at Marienbad: Which Year at Where? – an essay by Mark Polizzotti at The Criterion Collection

1961 films
1960s avant-garde and experimental films
1960s French-language films
Films set in hotels
Films directed by Alain Resnais
Films produced by Robert Dorfmann
Films produced by Anatole Dauman
Films shot in Munich
French avant-garde and experimental films
French black-and-white films
Golden Lion winners
Italian black-and-white films
Italian avant-garde and experimental films
1960s Italian films
1960s French films